Leonard T. Connors, Jr. (April 11, 1929 – December 4, 2016) was an American Republican Party politician who served in the New Jersey State Senate from 1982 to 2008, where he represented the 9th Legislative District. Previously he served on the Ocean County Board of Chosen Freeholders from 1977 to 1982, and was the Mayor of Surf City, New Jersey from 1966 to 2015.

Born in Jersey City and raised in Wood-Ridge, New Jersey, Connors graduated from Wood-Ridge High School before serving for two years in the United States Air Force.

Connors died on December 4, 2016, at the age of 87 at his home in Seacrest nursing home.

Career
In the 209th session, Connors sponsored Senate Bill No. 692, prohibiting possession or consumption of alcoholic beverages on private property by persons under legal drinking age. This bill amended P.L. 1979, c.264 (C.2C:33-15), which had banned underage consumption and possession only in motor vehicles and other public areas. In the 2006-08 session, Connors served on the Senate's State Government Committee and the Community & Urban Affairs Committee.

He announced in January 2007 that he would be retiring and would not be a candidate in 2007. Connors' son, Christopher J. Connors served in the New Jersey General Assembly where he also represents the 9th District, and succeeded him in the Senate in 2008.

References

External links
Senator Connor's Senate Website
New Jersey Legislature financial disclosure form for 2006 (PDF)
New Jersey Legislature financial disclosure form for 2005 (PDF)
New Jersey Legislature financial disclosure form for 2004 (PDF)
Senate Bill 692

1929 births
2016 deaths
Mayors of places in New Jersey
County commissioners in New Jersey
Republican Party New Jersey state senators
New Jersey Republicans
People from Jersey City, New Jersey
People from Surf City, New Jersey
People from Wood-Ridge, New Jersey
Politicians from Ocean County, New Jersey